Quaile is a surname. Notable people with the surname include:

Barbara Quaile (1906–1999), Scottish nurse and midwife
Elizabeth Quaile (1874–1951), American piano pedagogue of Irish birth
Mary Quaile (1886–1958), Irish trade unionist

See also
Quail (disambiguation)
Quayle